City2City was an intercity coach operator providing services in Germany. It was a subsidiary of National Express, the largest intercity coach operator in the United Kingdom.

History

City2City was launched on 2 April 2013 with 15 Mercedes-Benz Tourismos. It ceased in October 2014 with National Express citing the congested market making it unlikely to be profitable, making it the first coach operator to cease operating after the intercity coach market was deregulated.

Routes
Cities on the network included Frankfurt, Cologne, Düsseldorf, Dortmund, Duisburg, Stuttgart, Munich, Bremen and Hanover. Cologne and Frankfurt airports were served by City2City.

Fleet
Operations commenced in April 2013 with 15 Mercedes-Benz Tourismo coaches. When operations ceased in October 2014, the fleet comprised 25 vehicles.

References

External links
Company website

Bus companies of Germany
National Express companies
2013 establishments in Germany
2014 disestablishments in Germany

de:City2city